Adrienne Bain is a former association football player who represented New Zealand at international level.

Bain made a single appearance for the Football Ferns in a 0–0 draw with Korea Republic on 10 September 1995.

References

Year of birth missing (living people)
Living people
New Zealand women's international footballers
New Zealand women's association footballers
Women's association footballers not categorized by position